Fariha Róisín (born 1990) is an Australian-Canadian writer. Her work frequently covers her identity as a queer South Asian Muslim woman, as well as self-care and pop culture. She released her debut poetry collection How to Cure a Ghost in 2019 and her debut novel Like a Bird in 2020.

Early life  
Róisín was raised in a Muslim family to Bengali immigrant parents in Sydney, Australia. She described her family as lower-middle class for most of her life. Her environment was predominantly white, and the mainstream white beauty standards affected her self-esteem negatively, with the result that she used skin-lightening cream provided by her parents, and began dieting at age 12. She is a survivor of child sexual abuse.

She moved to the United States at age 19 to attend law school but dropped out to pursue a writing career.

Róisín had an abortion at age 19 and has spoken publicly about processing shame related to the procedure through her Muslim faith. During adolescence she engaged in self-cutting and experienced suicidal ideation, and attempted suicide at age 25.

Career 
Róisín has been a freelance writer since 2010 and has written for publications such as The New York Times, Bon Appetit and The Hairpin. She frequently writes on personal topics such as self-care, and has used Instagram to fight her body dysmorphia and to discuss sociopolitical issues like the Muslim Ban.

Róisín models. She appeared in Jidenna's 2019 music video for the song "Sufi Woman". She names Maryam Nassir Zadeh as her favorite designer.

With writer Zeba Blay she co-hosted the pop culture analysis podcast Two Brown Girls from 2012 to 2017.

Her debut poetry collection How to Cure a Ghost was released on September 24, 2019 under Abrams Image. The book deals with "traumas she's experienced as a queer Muslim woman" and covers topics such as Islamophobia, experiencing sexual assault, and white supremacy. The collection was written over five years.

Róisín's first novel Like A Bird was released on September 15, 2020 under Unnamed Press.

Personal life 
Róisín is Muslim and identifies as queer. She previously lived in Montreal and New York City until moving to Los Angeles where she presently resides.

Works 
 2019. How to Cure a Ghost. First edition, publication date 24 September 2019, Abrams Image. 
2020. Like a Bird. First edition, publication date 15 September 2020, Unnamed Press. 
2022. Who Is Wellness For?: An Examination of Wellness Culture and Who It Leaves Behind. First edition, publication date June 14, 2022, Harper Wave.

References

External links 
 Official website

1990 births
Living people
21st-century Australian women writers
21st-century Australian poets
Australian models
21st-century Canadian women writers
Writers from Sydney
Bengali Canadian
21st-century Bengali poets
Queer women
Australian LGBT poets
LGBT Muslims
Canadian Muslims
Australian Muslims
Bengali novelists
Canadian LGBT poets
21st-century Canadian poets
Australian women poets
Canadian women poets
Australian emigrants to Canada
21st-century Canadian LGBT people